Doyon may refer to:

Cyrille Doyon (1842–1918), Quebec merchant, farmer and political figure
Marie-Claude Doyon (born 1965), Canadian luger who competed in the late 1980s
Mario Doyon (born 1968), retired Canadian ice hockey defenceman
Pierre Adolphe Adrien Doyon (1827–1907), French dermatologist and balneologist born in Grenoble
Stephanie Doyon (born Maine), an American novelist best known for her award-winning novel, The Greatest Man in Cedar Hole

See also
Doyon, North Dakota, an unincorporated community
Doyon, is a hamlet in the province of Namur (Belgium)
Doyon, Limited, one of thirteen Alaska Native Regional Corporations created under the Alaska Native Claims Settlement Act of 1971 (ANCSA) in settlement of aboriginal land claims